Joshua Kyle Beauchamp (born March 31, 2000) is a Canadian-American dancer, singer, choreographer and fashion model. He represented Canada and is ex-dance captain in the global pop group Now United. He began his career at local dance competitions, becoming part of big groups like NXG Company and the dance company ImmaBEAST.

Career 

Beauchamp is often referred to as a dancer because his career started in 2006, since then he is seen as such. Despite his years of dancing, Josh also sings.

In 2015, the singer Justin Bieber retweeted his dance cover of "Sorry". Josh has also won one of the editions of the K-Days Talent Search contest.

Josh was contacted to travel to Los Angeles for Now United auditions. He narrowly missed the project, because just like Noah Urrea, he had signed up to represent the United States, his mother's country, thus competing with one of the best friends he made in the boot camp held in California. However, when the project's creator, Simon Fuller learned that Josh was actually Canadian, like his father, he decided to put him in the group to represent his country of origin.

In 2018, he participated in the second season of the American reality competition television series World of Dance in the Junior division along with dancer Taylor Hatala. In 2020, Josh had a small part in Bieber's music video "That's What Love Is" dancing together with dancer Charlize Glass.

Josh, in 2019, gained prominence singing his first line in the music video for Crazy Stupid Silly Love. From there, he started gaining more highlights in the corner.

And in January 2021, Josh recorded a cover of Justin Bieber's song "Home to Mama"

In November 10, 2022, Josh announced vis Instagram that he's going to pursue a solo careen, with the announcement of his departure to the group, leading the "Forever United Tour" as his last show as a NU member

Controversy 
Beauchamp was criticized on Twitter after saying that he helped a choreographer for some K-pop groups to create some of their choreography. The fans of the K-pop groups reacted negatively. Josh ended up deactivating his Twitter account for a while, but after all was cleared as a misunderstanding, he returned with positive messages from several fans.

Personal life 
Josh is a nickname for Joshua Kyle Beauchamp, his parents are Ursula and Ron Beauchamp. He has two brothers, Jaden and Jonah Beauchamp, and two dogs, Penelope and Daisy.

Filmography

Music Videos

Documentaries

References

External links 
 
 

2000 births
Living people
Canadian male dancers
Franco-Albertan people
Male dancers
Musicians from Alberta
People from St. Albert, Alberta
XIX Entertainment artists
21st-century Canadian male singers
Now United members